The 2010 Canadian Figure Skating Championships were held from January 11 to 17, 2010 in London, Ontario. The event determines the national champions of Canada and was organized by Skate Canada, the nation's figure skating governing body. The senior-level events were held at the John Labatt Centre and the junior- and novice-level events were held at the Western Fair Sports Centre. Skaters competed at the senior, junior, and novice levels in the disciplines of men's singles, women's singles, pair skating, and ice dancing. Although the official International Skating Union terminology for female skaters in the singles category is ladies, Skate Canada uses women officially. The results of this competition were used to pick the Canadian teams to the 2010 Winter Olympics, the 2010 World Championships, the 2010 Four Continents Championships, and the 2010 World Junior Championships, as well as the Canadian national team.

The novice event had been held separately in previous years; the last time it was held with the senior events was 1997.

Schedule
All times are Eastern Standard Time (UTC-5).

 Monday, January 11
 19:40: Novice Compulsory Dance
 Tuesday, January 12
 9:15: Junior Pair Short
 11:05: Novice Men Short
 13:30: Novice Pair Short
 15:25: Junior Compulsory Dance
 17:30: Opening Ceremony
17:55: Novice Women Short
20:20: Junior Men Short
 Wednesday, January 13
 9:00: Novice Free Dance
 11:20: Novice Men Free
 14:05: Novice Pair Free
 16:10: Junior Original Dance
 18:20: Novice Women Free
 20:55: Junior Women Short
 Thursday, January 14
 9:25: Junior Free Dance
 11:45: Junior Men Free
 17:00: Novice Gala Exhibition And Opening Ceremonies
 17:10: Junior Women Free
 18:00: Senior Compulsory Dance
 20:00 Junior Pair Free
 Friday, January 15
 9:55: Senior Women Short Program
 12:55: Senior Pair Short Program
 16:55: Senior Original Dance
 19:25: Senior Men Short Program
 Saturday, January 16
 11:30: Senior Pair Free
 15:00: Senior Women Free
 19:00: Senior Free Dance
 Sunday, January 17
 14:30: Medal Presentations – Senior Pairs, Women, Dance
 15:00: Hall Of Fame Special Presentations
 16:00: Senior Men Free
 19:00: Olympic Team Announcement
 19:30: Medal Presentations – Men
 20:15: Junior/Senior Exhibition Gala

Senior results

Men

Women

Pairs

Ice dancing

Junior results

Men

Women

Pairs

Ice dancing

Novice results

Men

Women

Pairs

Ice dancing

International team selections

Winter Olympics
The Olympic team was announced as follows:

World Championships
The World Championships team was announced as follows:

Four Continents Championships
The Four Continents Championships team was announced as follows:

World Junior Championships

References

External links
 2010 Canadian Figure Skating Championships senior results at SkateCanada.ca
 2010 Canadian Figure Skating Championships
 2010 Canadian Figure Skating Championships Junior and Novice
 
 
 Senior-level results
 Novice and Junior-level results

Canadian Figure Skating Championships
Figure skating
Canadian Figure Skating Championships
Sports competitions in London, Ontario
2010 in Ontario